Mount Bain is a mountain, 2,090 m, standing between Hopkins and Erskine Glaciers on the west coast of Graham Land. It was named by the United Kingdom Antarctic Place-Names Committee (UK-APC) in 1958 for James S. Bain of London, who specialized in the development of polar and high altitude rations, with special emphasis on plastic vacuum packaging, between 1948 and 1956.

Mountains of Graham Land
Loubet Coast